Automatic image annotation (also known as automatic image tagging or linguistic indexing) is the process by which a computer system automatically assigns metadata in the form of captioning or keywords to a digital image. This application of computer vision techniques is used in image retrieval systems to organize and locate images of interest from a database.

This method can be regarded as a type of multi-class image classification with a very large number of classes - as large as the vocabulary size. Typically, image analysis in the form of extracted feature vectors and the training annotation words are used by machine learning techniques to attempt to automatically apply annotations to new images. The first methods learned the correlations between image features and training annotations, then techniques were developed using machine translation to try to translate the textual vocabulary with the 'visual vocabulary', or clustered regions known as blobs. Work following these efforts have included classification approaches, relevance models and so on.

The advantages of automatic image annotation versus content-based image retrieval (CBIR) are that queries can be more naturally specified by the user. CBIR generally (at present) requires users to search by image concepts such as color and texture, or finding example queries. Certain image features in example images may override the concept that the user is really focusing on. The traditional methods of image retrieval such as those used by libraries have relied on manually annotated images, which is expensive and time-consuming, especially given the large and constantly growing image databases in existence.

See also
Content-based image retrieval
Object categorization from image search
Object detection
Outline of object recognition

References

Further reading

 Word co-occurrence model

 Annotation as machine translation

 Statistical models

 Automatic linguistic indexing of pictures

 Hierarchical Aspect Cluster Model 

 Latent Dirichlet Allocation model 

 Supervised multiclass labeling

 Texture similarity

 Support Vector Machines

 Ensemble of Decision Trees and Random Subwindows

 Maximum Entropy

 Relevance models 

 Relevance models using continuous probability density functions 

 Coherent Language Model

 Inference networks 

 Multiple Bernoulli distribution 

 Multiple design alternatives

 Image captioning

 Natural scene annotation

 Relevant low-level global filters 

 Global image features and nonparametric density estimation 

 Video semantics

 Image Annotation Refinement

 Automatic Image Annotation by Ensemble of Visual Descriptors

 A New Baseline for Image Annotation

Simultaneous Image Classification and Annotation

 TagProp: Discriminative Metric Learning in Nearest Neighbor Models for Image Auto-Annotation

 Image Annotation Using Metric Learning in Semantic Neighbourhoods

 Automatic Image Annotation Using Deep Learning Representations

Holistic Image Annotation using Salient Regions and Background Image Information

 Medical Image Annotation using bayesian networks and active learning

Applications of artificial intelligence
Applications of computer vision